Constrictor is the name of two fictional characters appearing in American comic books published by Marvel Comics.

Publication history
The Frank Payne version of Constrictor made his first appearance in The Incredible Hulk (vol. 2) #212 (1977) and was created by Len Wein and John Romita Sr., then drawn in his first issue by Sal Buscema. 

The character went on to feature as a supervillain in Captain America #228-229, 231 (1978–1979), Iron Man #126-127 (1979), Power Man & Iron Fist #66 (1980), Captain America Annual #5 (1981), Power Man & Iron Fist #78, 84 (1982), Captain America #281-283 (1983), #309-311 (1985), Fantastic Four #334 (1989), Marvel Comics Presents #74, 86-87. 89-92 (1991), The New Warriors Annual #2 (1992), The Spectacular Spider-Man Annual #12 (1992), Web of Spider-Man Annual #8 (1992), Iron Man #284 (1992), Nick Fury: Agent of S.H.I.E.L.D. (vol. 3) #36 (1992), Marvel Comics Presents #119-120 (1993), Alpha Flight #121 (1993), Captain America #412 (1993), Sabretooth #1-3 (1994), Marvel Fanfare (vol. 2) #6 (1997), Thunderbolts #24-25 (1999), Gambit (vol. 3) #12 (1999), #16-19 (2000), Gambit Annual 2000 (2000), The Hood #2-4, 6 (2002), Agent X #6 (2003), Weapon X (vol. 2) #26, 28 (2004), Secret War #3-5 (2004–2005), Marvel Team-Up (vol. 3) #7 (2005) and She-Hulk #9 (2005).

Constrictor appeared as a supporting character in Deadpool #35 (1999), 38-45 (2000) and 61 (2002). The character went on to feature in Cable & Deadpool #7-12 (2004–2005) and The Thing (vol. 2) #1-3, 8 (2006) in a more heroic role. Constrictor later appeared as a member of the Initiative in Avengers: The Initiative #1, 4-5, 8, 10, 12-15, 17 (2007–2008) and featured prominently in #20-24, 26-35 (2009–2010) during the Dark Reign and Siege story lines.

Fictional character biography

Frank Payne
Frank Payne was an agent of the international espionage organization S.H.I.E.L.D., and the father of an adult daughter, Mia. When S.H.I.E.L.D. needed a costumed "supervillain" to go undercover in the criminal organization called the Corporation, Frank was given a snake-themed costume and a pair of wrist-mounted electrified metal coils. Using the false identity of "Frank Schlicting" from Racine, Wisconsin, and the codename of "Constrictor", he infiltrated the group, only to suffer a nervous breakdown and become a career criminal in earnest. As a result of his defection, S.H.I.E.L.D. allowed his daughter to believe that he had died. As the Constrictor, "Schlicting" debuted in combat against the Hulk, while attempting to assassinate the Hulk's friend Jim Wilson on behalf of the Corporation. The Corporation next sent him to assassinate Captain America; the Constrictor was trapped in a cave-in of S.H.I.E.L.D. headquarters, and was freed by Captain America.

The Constrictor would remain an independent mercenary, criminal, and assassin after the dissolution of the Corporation. He next battled Iron Man as a member of Justin Hammer's criminal army. He next teamed with Sabretooth to safeguard a stolen jade tiger statuette, and battled Power Man and the Daughters of the Dragon. He teamed with Sabretooth again to help Sabretooth get revenge on Misty Knight. They fought Iron Fist, Power Man, El Aguila, and Misty Knight.

Working for the Viper, he battled Captain America and Nomad. He wound up turning against the Viper. He next joined with other criminals in an attempt to assassinate the hospitalized Thing.

Constrictor was also invited to join the Serpent Society, which he turned down and walked out after the first meeting. He subsequently tried to turn them over to the Avengers, and Anaconda later exacted revenge on him. While in the hospital recuperating from the beating, he was nearly killed by the Scourge of the Underworld disguised as a nurse, but was saved by Captain America.

Constrictor eventually took an assignment to kill the Beast in Belgium by Commander Courage who was impersonating the Red Ghost. Finding out that he had been set up, Constrictor teamed up with Beast to defeat Commander Courage.

He later had a showdown with his common-law stepfather McAvey, who had murdered his mother.

Constrictor has battled numerous heroes over the years, including repeated encounters with Captain America, Iron Fist, Luke Cage, Spider-Man, the Thing and even the short-lived character NFL SuperPro. Although Luke Cage and Nick Fury eventually uncovered Payne's former identity, he chose to retain the Schlicting alias and to allow his daughter to believe that her father was dead. During the Acts of Vengeance, Constrictor was one of the many villains that attacked the Fantastic Four.

Constrictor appeared as a supporting character in Deadpool wherein he and Titania moved in with him as his roommates. During their uncomfortable living situation, Constrictor was convinced that Titania was actually a man. It would turn out that he was right that she was not what she seemed; but not about her gender as Titania was revealed to actually be the mutant shapeshifter and Deadpool's former lover, Copycat. He was later found to be under the employment of Justin Hammer. When cutbacks forced his supervisor to lay him off, he responded by brutally attacking him.

He did join the seventh incarnation of the Masters of Evil led by the Crimson Cowl. During the Deadpool story arc, it was also revealed that Constrictor had been part of a very short-lived rendition of the Wizard's Frightful Four.

At one point he was one of the many mercenaries hired to kill Alex Hayden, who was at this time thought to be Wade Wilson. He works with many unnamed mercs and some notable ones, including Crossfire. In the story it was stated that Wilson was a hard-ass, so Hayden could not be Deadpool. Hayden then broke Constrictor's nose. The Constrictor was later seen in the same issue being used, or rather his vibranium coils were used, to drag the Rhino into a river. Somehow both escaped.

After a severe beating from Hercules, the Constrictor was awarded several million dollars in a lawsuit. Nighthawk, rich himself, convinces the Constrictor that with all his money there was no need to be a criminal anymore, and he has apparently turned over a new leaf and decided to be a hero. He is currently under the employment of S.H.I.E.L.D. as a member of the new Six-Pack. He was most recently seen at an all-superhuman charity poker tournament hosted by the Thing (who also had a hand in the Constrictor's apparent reformation), where Hercules regains at least a large portion of the money he lost to the Constrictor in a non-tournament side game.

Constrictor plays a small role in the "Secret War" crossover event.

The Constrictor was identified as one of the 142 registered superheroes who have registered as part of the 50-State Initiative and joined Camp Hammond's staff. The Constrictor was later revealed to be part of the Shadow Initiative, a black ops version of the Initiative under the command of Henry Gyrich. He travels with Trauma and Mutant Zero, two other members of the group, into Madison Square Garden; they rescue Initiative recruits from the invading alien forces called the Warbound.

Constrictor saved Gyrich from the clone of MVP known as "KIA"; however, KIA severed Constrictor's forearms in retaliation. Constrictor was quickly ferried away to safety by fellow team member Bengal. He was given bionic hands which functioned like his coils, and was also presented with a Purple Heart for his valiant efforts. Following a supervillain ambush outside of Camp Hammond, student hero Butterball washed out the camp, he and fellow instructor Taskmaster give Schaub a photo of himself standing triumphant over the defeated 'villains' as a reward for his efforts.

During the "Secret Invasion," Bengal discovers that the Skrulls have taken over Camp Hammond and summons the rest of the Shadow Initiative to deal with them. They decide to assassinate Queen Veranke, but the attempt fails and they are taken captive.

During a conflict with the initiative and some terrorists as seen in the "Dark Reign," Constrictor helps the Women Warriors, one of the official government hero teams. He stops an out-of-control passenger plane, saving many lives, including that of the hero Diamondback. Constrictor is visibly distressed as civilians thank him for his heroic actions. Soon after, he and Diamondback begin a romantic relationship. Frank later discovers that Diamondback is secretly working for Gauntlet's "Avengers Resistance". He keeps her secret despite knowing the danger this involves for them both; mainly the Initiative head, the Taskmaster, would kill them both.

During the Siege of Asgard, Constrictor becomes buried under a pile of falling rubble. Taskmaster digs him out and Constrictor sees Diamondback running towards Captain America. Wrongfully assuming that she has reconciled with and returned to her former lover, Constrictor sorrowfully joins Taskmaster in fleeing the battlefield. The two also begin working as mercenaries and partners in crime.

Constrictor was later recruited by Max Fury to join the Shadow Council's incarnation of the Masters of Evil.

As part of the "Marvel NOW!" in the pages of Avengers Arena, a flashback experienced by Arcade showed that he had previously acquired the ownership of a bar in Bagalia called the Hole where he catches Constrictor (who previously attended Arcade's birthday party and made fun of him) robbing it. Arcade defeated Constrictor by crushing him with a large hammer-like trap.

During the "Infinity" storyline, Constrictor is among the villains recruited by Spymaster to help him attack the almost-defenseless Stark Tower.

In the pages of Avengers Undercover, Constrictor was with the Masters of Evil when Baron Helmut Zemo became the new leader following the death of Max Fury. Constrictor becomes the bodyguard of Baron Helmut Zemo. Constrictor is shown to live in a building called the Snakepit in Bagalia which is also the headquarters of the Young Masters.

Frank Payne later retired from crime and moved in with Rachael Leighton. When it was discovered that Frank has a terminal illness, Rachael became Diamondback again and joined Serpent Solutions in order to get the money to help with his medical treatment. It was later revealed that Frank Payne had died.

Frank Payne's son
When Frank Payne had a brief relationship with Sandy and later left him, Sandy gave birth to a son who hated his father for his abandonment. After Frank Payne died, he left his battlesuit for his son in his will and he became the new Constrictor. The son considered this as a way to get back at his late father.

Constrictor later went to the restaurant Herbie's and attended a supervillain meeting held by the Wizard who informed them that Victor von Doom has gone straight. The meeting was crashed by Doctor Doom in his version of the Iron Man armor.

Liwei later hired Constrictor to break into Danny Rand's apartment so that he can obtain for Chosin the Book of the Iron Fist. When Chosin refused to pay Constrictor double and planned to have him tortured, Constrictor summoned the Serpent Society. The fight was crashed by Iron Fist and Sabretooth. Constrictor was poisoned by Rat of 12 Plagues as Chosin starts to get his hands on the Book of the Iron Fist. To honor Frank Payne, Sabretooth took Constrictor to the hospital.

During the "Search for Tony Stark" arc, Constrictor later joined up with the Hood's crime syndicate where they attacked Victor von Doom at Castle Doom.

In a prelude to the "Hunted" storyline, Constrictor is among the animal-themed characters that are captured by Kraven the Hunter, Taskmaster, and Black Ant for the upcoming Great Hunt that is sponsored by Arcade's company Arcade Industries. He was watching the fight between Spider-Man and the Scorpion until the Hunter-Bots created by Arcade Industries arrived. When the Great Hunt begins, Constrictor is attacked by one of the Hunter-Bots. Surviving the attack, Constrictor and the surviving animal-themed characters met up with Vulture.

Powers and abilities
The Constrictor's primary weapon is a pair of cybernetically-controlled, electrified, prehensile, wrist-mounted metal coils provided by Justin Hammer. The coils eject and retract from special appliances running from shoulder to wrist.

The previous sets of coils were made from an adamantium alloy, then from vibranium. The adamantium coils were traded to Gambit in exchange for a favor and are then subsequently used by Mister Sinister to reinforce an ailing Sabretooth's skeleton. The strength of the coils varies based on their construction, but the adamantium coils were powerful enough to lift and even temporarily restrain the Hulk. The vibranium coils have a contact-based aura that suppresses sound: while the coils are wrapped around a target's throat, the victim's voice cannot be heard.

The Constrictor's costume is lightly armored with partial bulletproofing around the chest and head area and the entire costume is electrically insulated, covering his entire body except for his lower face and chin. Although the Constrictor is a skilled unarmed combatant and street fighter, he usually relies exclusively on his coils in a fight.

After his encounter with KIA, Constrictor is implanted with cybernetic arms, the fingers of which duplicate the abilities of his old coils. His forearms still had the capacity to discharge coils out of the wrists like previously.

Other versions
An alternative version of Constrictor appeared in JLA/Avengers #4 (2003), part of the Marvel/DC crossover storyline, as part of Krona's supervillain army. Other versions of the character appear in the What If? storylines What If?: World War Hulk #1 (2010) and What If?: Secret Invasion #1 (2010) in minor and cameo roles.

House of M
A version of Constrictor appears in the House of M reality. In House of M: Masters of Evil #1-4 (2009–2010), Constrictor is a member of the Hood's incarnation of the Masters of Evil opposing mutants' superior role in society. The character was later killed by Sebastian Shaw during the group's fight with S.H.I.E.L.D.

In other media

Television
The Frank Payne incarnation of Constrictor appears in The Avengers: Earth's Mightiest Heroes, voiced by Cam Clarke in his first appearance, and by Troy Baker in the second. In the episode "Breakout, Part 1", Constrictor escapes from the Big House. In "Ultron-5", Constrictor joins the Serpent Society to fight the Avengers and Ultron-5. In "Yellowjacket", Constrictor and the Serpent Society are captured by Yellowjacket and placed in a new Big House, though they later escape.

Video games
The Frank Payne incarnation of Constrictor appears as a boss, later unlockable playable character, in Marvel: Avengers Alliance.

Toys
 A figure of Constrictor was released as an exclusive foreign release as part of Mattel's Secret Wars toyline.
 A figure of Constrictor was released in wave 11 of Hasbro's 3 3/4" Marvel Universe toyline.
 A figure of Constrictor was released in wave 1 of Hasbro's 6" Marvel Legends 2012 toyline.

References

External links
  Constrictor at Marvel.com
  Constrictor at Marvel.wikia.com
 
 In the PoP!-Light: Constrictor

Characters created by Len Wein
Characters created by Sal Buscema
Comics characters introduced in 1977
Fictional mercenaries in comics
Marvel Comics male superheroes
Marvel Comics male supervillains
Marvel Comics superheroes
Marvel Comics supervillains